Marianne Brocklehurst (1832–1898) was an English traveller and collector of Egyptian antiquities. She supported a number of Egyptian excavations and donated most of her collection of antiquities to the West Park museum in Macclesfield.

Personal life
Brocklehurst was one of the eight children of John Brocklehurst, a wealthy Macclesfield silk manufacturer, and his wife Mary. The family started out in the button making business, but they moved into silk in the 19th century.

In 1861 she accepted a marriage proposal from one Henry Coventry, a distant relation of the Earls of Coventry, but her father declined consent; Brocklehurst broke off the engagement.  She never married, but from the 1870s shared her life with her companion Mary Booth. Brocklehurst and Booth shared a home, 'Bagstones', at Wincle outside Macclesfield.

Brocklehurst died in London in 1898. It is thought she committed suicide. Booth inherited the property and lived there until her own death in 1912. They are buried in the same grave, with a joint gravestone, in the churchyard at Wincle.

Egyptology

In 1873 Marianne Brocklehurst and Mary Booth ('the two MBs') visited Egypt. While in Egypt, she met Amelia Edwards, another English traveller, and the two parties travelled together in a flotilla up the Nile. Edwards later published her account of the journey in the bestselling  A Thousand Miles up the Nile (1877). Brocklehurst's own travel diary of the voyage was published in 2005. Brocklehurst and Edwards competed with each other in the illegal extraction of antiquities from Egypt. Brocklehurst and Booth returned to Egypt in 1876–1877, in 1883 and then for a final time in 1890–1891. On the final trip they witnessed the removal of a large quantity of recently removed 21st Dynasty mummies from Thebes.

Brocklehurst was a funder of excavation efforts. She contributed to Edwards' Egypt Exploration Fund, and was an early subscriber to the fund-raising efforts of Flinders Petrie. Through these connections she acquired a number of artefacts. Brocklehurst offered funding to the local council to build a museum to hold these objects, and as a result Macclesfield's West Park museum was opened in 1898. There was some dispute between the Brocklehursts and the council about the building of the museum, and she remained in London on the opening day.

References 

1832 births
1898 deaths
English travel writers
British women travel writers
English collectors
Women collectors
English Egyptologists